Denver Jewish Day School, formerly known as Rocky Mountain Hebrew Academy and Herzl/RMHA at the Denver Campus, is a pluralistic Jewish day school in Denver, Colorado.

History
Theodor Herzl Day School, named after Theodor Herzl known best as the visionary of the State of Israel, is a community Jewish day school established in 1975, and the Rocky Mountain Hebrew Academy, a co-ed Jewish high school established in 1979, combined to become the Denver Campus for Jewish Education in 2002. Now the school is known as Denver Jewish Day School.

The school is accredited by the Association of Colorado Independent Schools.

Campus
The 24-acre campus is divided between the lower school (K-5) and the upper school (6-12). The upper school area consists of a school building with lockers and classrooms for students in addition to an attached full-size gymnasium for athletics and special events. The lower school consists of classrooms and administrative offices as well as a playground for recess. On the perimeter of campus there is a baseball diamond, and throughout the campus there are expansive lawns.

Curriculum
The Denver Jewish Day School offers a dual-curriculum in both General Studies (English, Math, Science, Literature, Language) as well as Judaic Studies (Hebrew, Bible, Jewish History). Students take both general and Judaic classes throughout their 13 years at the school.

Extracurricular activities
The DJDS athletic teams, known as the Tigers (as a nod to the upper school's mascot when it was called RMHA), participate in interscholastic competition in baseball, basketball, soccer and volleyball. The basketball program drew media attention in February 2008 after the school's request to the Colorado High School Activities Association for some scheduling flexibility to avoid playing games during the Jewish sabbath was denied.

Notable alumni
Shayna Rose - Actress 
Bryan Fogel - Winner of the 2018 Academy Award for Best Documentary Feature for his film Icarus

References

External links
Official Website

Educational institutions established in 1975
High schools in Denver
Jewish day schools in the United States
Jews and Judaism in Denver
Private high schools in Colorado
Private middle schools in Colorado
Private elementary schools in Colorado
1975 establishments in Colorado